Atherinella is a genus of Neotropical silversides from freshwater, brackish and marine habitats in Mexico, Central America and South America.

Species
The currently recognized species in this genus are:
 Atherinella alvarezi (Díaz-Pardo, 1972) (Gulf silverside)
 Atherinella ammophila Chernoff & R. R. Miller, 1984 (La Palma silverside)
 Atherinella argentea Chernoff, 1986 (moon silverside)
 Atherinella balsana (Meek, 1902) (Balsas silverside)
 Atherinella beani (Meek & Hildebrand, 1923)
 Atherinella blackburni (L. P. Schultz, 1949) (beach silverside)
 Atherinella brasiliensis (Quoy & Gaimard, 1825) (Brazilian silversides)
 Atherinella callida Chernoff, 1986 (cunning silverside)
 Atherinella chagresi (Meek & Hildebrand, 1914)
 Atherinella colombiensis (C. L. Hubbs, 1920)
 Atherinella crystallina (D. S. Jordan & Culver, 1895) (blackfin silverside)
 Atherinella elegans Chernoff, 1986 (Fuerte silverside)
 Atherinella eriarcha D. S. Jordan & C. H. Gilbert, 1882 (longfin silverside)
 Atherinella guatemalensis (Günther, 1864) (Guatemala silverside)
 Atherinella guija (Hildebrand, 1925)
 Atherinella hubbsi (W. A. Bussing, 1979)
 Atherinella jiloaensis (W. A. Bussing, 1979)
 Atherinella lisa (Meek, 1904) (Naked silverside)
 Atherinella marvelae (Chernoff & R. R. Miller, 1982) (Eyipantla silverside)
 Atherinella meeki (N. Miller, 1907)
 Atherinella milleri (W. A. Bussing, 1979)
 Atherinella nepenthe (G. S. Myers & Wade, 1942) (pitcher silverside)
 Atherinella nesiotes (G. S. Myers & Wade, 1942) (broadstripe silverside)
 Atherinella nocturna (G. S. Myers & Wade, 1942)
 Atherinella pachylepis (Günther, 1864) (thickscale silverside)
 Atherinella pallida (Fowler, 1944)
 Atherinella panamensis Steindachner, 1875 (Panama silverside)
 Atherinella pellosemeion Chernoff, 1986 (Mancuernas silverside)
 Atherinella robbersi (Fowler, 1950)
 Atherinella sallei (Regan, 1903) (large-eye silverside)
 Atherinella sardina (Meek, 1907)
 Atherinella schultzi (Álvarez & Carranza, 1952) (Chimalapa silverside)
 Atherinella serrivomer Chernoff, 1986 (bright silverside)
 Atherinella starksi (Meek & Hildebrand, 1923) (star silverside)
 Atherinella venezuelae (C. H. Eigenmann, 1920)

References 

 
Atherinopsidae
Ray-finned fish genera
Taxa named by Franz Steindachner